Giorgi Oniani (born 7 September 1983) is a Georgian retired football defender.

Career
Born in Tbilisi, Oniani began his career with FC Lokomotivi Tbilisi. In January 2006, he moved to FC Dinamo Batumi and after six months joined FC Olimpi Rustavi In January 2007, he transferred to FC Sioni Bolnisi, but stayed only half a year. He then moved to FC Carl Zeiss Jena in July 2007, He left Jena after one year and moved to Spartak Nalchik.

References

External links

Living people
1983 births
Footballers from Tbilisi
Association football defenders
Footballers from Georgia (country)
Georgia (country) under-21 international footballers
FC Carl Zeiss Jena players
FC Dinamo Batumi players
FC Dila Gori players
2. Bundesliga players
Expatriate footballers in Germany
PFC Spartak Nalchik players